Get Together may refer to:

 "Get Together" (The Youngbloods song), written and recorded by Chet Powers, and also previously recorded by The Kingston Trio and others
 "Get Together" (Madonna song)
 "Get Together", by Solange Knowles from the album Solo Star
 The Sims 4: Get Together, an expansion pack for the video game The Sims 4.

See also 
 Let's Get Together (disambiguation)
 Get Together with Andy Williams, an album by Andy Williams